The Daraa offensive (January 2015), was a rebel offensive launched in Daraa Governorate during the Syrian civil war, in an attempt to capture the remaining Army positions in Shaykh Maskin, and thus secure the Daraa–Damascus highway, and other positions in Daraa province.

Rebel offensive
On 24 January 2015, the rebels announced three battles in Daraa Governorate:
 "Fidak Ya Rasola Allah", meaning "We can sacrifice our lives for you, Messenger of Allah", also known as "Victory only comes from Allah"
 "Kick their Doors in"
 "Charge of the United"

That day, 10 rebel fighters (including a field commander) were killed. The next day, rebels breached Brigade 82 and captured its HQ, with fighting ongoing around the area. According to the news agency Alaan, rebels also captured the radar base in the northwest of the town. At least 40 fighters from both sides were killed in the clashes. According to Al-Masdar News, 14 soldiers were killed before the Army retreated from Brigade 82. The rebels declared the town of Shaykh Maskin as "liberated" soon after the Army retreated from the base. According to Al-Arabiya news agency, rebels overran most of the town after they captured Brigade 82.

On 29 January, rebels advanced near Al-Suhayliyyeh and Dilli, capturing farms adjacent to the northern part of Shaykh Maskin. However, according to Al-Masdar, the Army recaptured the Faroun Storage Facility and positions in Dilli after these initial gains. The same source also claimed that the Army repelled a rebel attack on Al-Atash village. Two days later, the Army launched a counter-offensive on Brigade 82, claiming that it recaptured the Oxygen Plant and Niqta Al-Masarat and advanced to the base's northern entrance in its outskirts. However, the Army was forced to retreat from the north of the base "in order to regroup". Meanwhile, rebels advanced in Dilli village towards the centre. On 31 January, an Al Jazeera film crew visited the Brigade 82 radar base in the northwest of Shaykh Maskin, confirming that the base was taken during the initial phase of the offensive.

See also

Daraa Governorate campaign
 Battle of Al-Shaykh Maskin

References

Military operations of the Syrian civil war in 2015
Daraa Governorate in the Syrian civil war
Military operations of the Syrian civil war involving the Syrian government
Military operations of the Syrian civil war involving Hezbollah
Military operations of the Syrian civil war involving Quds Force
Military operations of the Syrian civil war involving the Free Syrian Army
Military operations of the Syrian civil war involving the al-Nusra Front